A ram-air intake is any intake design which uses the dynamic air pressure created by vehicle motion, or ram pressure, to increase the static air pressure inside of the intake manifold on an internal combustion engine, thus allowing a greater massflow through the engine and hence increasing engine power.

Design features

The ram-air intake works by reducing the intake air velocity by increasing the cross-sectional area of the intake ducting. When gas velocity goes down the dynamic pressure is reduced, while the static pressure is increased. The increased static pressure in the plenum chamber has a positive effect on engine power, both because of the pressure itself and the increased air density that this higher pressure gives.

Ram-air systems are used on high-performance vehicles, most often on motorcycles and performance cars. The 1990 Kawasaki Ninja  ZX-11 C1 model used a ram-air intake, the very first on any production motorcycle. Ram-air was a feature on some cars in the sixties. It fell out of favor in the seventies, but recently made a comeback.  While ram-air intakes may increase the volumetric efficiency of an engine, they can be difficult to combine with carburetors, which rely on a venturi-engineered pressure drop to draw fuel through the main jet.  As the pressurised ram-air may kill this venturi effect, the carburetor needs to be designed to take this into account, or, alternatively, the engine may need fuel-injection.

At low speeds (subsonic speeds) increases in static pressure are however limited to a few percent. Given that the air velocity is reduced to zero without losses the pressure increase can be calculated accordingly. The lack of losses also means without heating the air. Thus a ram-air intake also is a cold air intake. In some cars the intake is placed behind the radiator, where not only the air is hot, but the pressure is below ambient pressure. The ram-air intake effect may be small, but so are other mild tuning techniques to increase cylinder filling like using larger, fresh air filters, high flow mass flow sensors, velocity stacks, tuned air box and large tubes from the filter to the engine.

Short ram air intake 

The short ram air intake is a form of aftermarket air intake for automobiles with internal combustion engines.

It replaces the OEM air intake with a short metal pipe and a conical air filter inside the engine bay. A significant increase in intake air volume will only occur in an engine where the factory intake piping was designed with baffles and other sound absorbing materials (rubber, etc.).

The term ram, albeit commonly used, is somewhat a misnomer. A true ram air intake device is something that enhances intake pressure or in the case of resonant systems such as Chrysler's Sonaramic, increases the torque with a peak at a certain RPM.

There is still some open debate on this issue, but some believe that a problem with short ram air intakes is that the air entering the intake is at a higher temperature due to the proximity of the engine, which may reduce some power. This may be partially offset by an increase in the volume of air entering the engine. To counter intake heat problems, many short ram intakes include some form of heat shield. Moving the intake inlet port further away from the engine block will also help to alleviate the problem and some users use a cold air intake where the inlet air is at or close to ambient temperature.  However, others claim that Short Ram Intakes (SRIs) or similar Warm Air Intakes (WAIs) offer benefits over Cold Air Intakes (CAIs) which include better MPG due to a more complete burning of fuel. Users with forced induction engines often opt for short ram intakes because compressors adjacent to the engine, especially turbochargers, heat the incoming air and negate much of the benefits of a cold air intake. Additional problems can result from using a short ram intake in cars utilizing a mass airflow sensor though most of today's sensors automatically adjust without issue. Turbulence in the intake airflow produced by the filter or piping, or a change in intake diameter at the point where the airflow is measured can produce inaccurate airflow readings. The error in airflow then translates to an error in the amount of added fuel. In the worst case, the air-fuel ratio can run lean, causing detonation and possibly engine failure although the airflow sensor will generally detect and correct the throttle to compensate for the warmer air. This can also be solved by modifying/elongating the intake piping, replacing the airflow meter, or by replacing/remapping the engine control computer to provide the correct amount of fuel for the intake airflow at all engine speeds.

A harmless but noticeable result of using a short ram air intake is an increase in intake noise, which may manifest as a sucking sound, and the loss of any silencing properties that the factory intake had.

Aircraft
Pitot sensors are used to measure ram pressure which, along with static pressure, is used to estimate the airspeed of an aircraft.

See also
Air filter
Booster
Ramjet
Supercharger
Turbocharger
Warm air intake
Short ram air intake
Diffuser (automotive)

References 

Engine technology
Automotive technologies
Motorcycle engines